Wog Wog is a locality in the Queanbeyan–Palerang Regional Council, New South Wales, Australia. It is located on the south side of the Corang River and to the east of the road from Braidwood to Nowra about 34 km north of Braidwood and 96 km southwest of Nowra. It consists mainly of forest, including parts of the Morton National Park. Its eastern boundary runs along the Budawang Range and includes Wog Wog Mountain and Corang Peak.

References

Localities in New South Wales
Queanbeyan–Palerang Regional Council
Southern Tablelands